In Old Arizona is a 1928 American pre-Code Western film directed by Raoul Walsh and Irving Cummings, nominated for five Academy Awards, including Best Picture. The film, which was based on the character of the Cisco Kid in the 1907 story "The Caballero's Way" by O. Henry, was a major innovation in Hollywood. It was the first major Western to use the new technology of sound and the first talkie to be filmed outdoors. It made extensive use of authentic locations, filming in Bryce Canyon National Park and Zion National Park in Utah, and the Mission San Juan Capistrano and the Mojave Desert in California. The film premiered in Los Angeles on December 25, 1928, and went into general release on January 20, 1929.

In Old Arizona contributed to creating the image of the singing cowboy, as its star, Warner Baxter, does some incidental singing. Baxter went on to win the Academy Award for Best Actor for his performance. Other nominations included Best Director for Irving Cummings, Best Writing for Tom Barry, Best Cinematography for Arthur Edeson, and Best Picture.

Plot synopsis
In Arizona, a bandit known as the Cisco Kid robs a stagecoach. Word of this deed reaches to Sergeant Micky Dunn, who is tasked by his superior to bring in the Cisco Kid dead or alive, with a $5,000 reward promised once he succeeds. They meet in a barber shop, though Dunn is unaware of the Cisco Kid's true identity and passes him off as a friendly civilian. When he leaves, the local blacksmith tells him that was the Cisco Kid, much to Dunn's chagrin.

The Cisco Kid is in a relationship with Tonia Maria, and visits her often. He loves her, but she has frequent affairs without his knowledge. Dunn and Maria meet each other and begin an affair. Dunn tells Maria that once he takes down the Cisco Kid, he will give the $5,000 reward to Maria, making her fall in love with him. They express their love for each other while the Cisco Kid secretly watches and listens nearby, learning of her betrayal. 
 
She writes a secret letter to Dunn telling him to come that evening to take down the Cisco Kid before he makes his escape. However, the Cisco Kid finds this letter and replaces it with a fake letter "from Maria" which he has written himself. His letter says that he will be dressed up in Maria's clothes in an effort to disguise himself from Dunn, while Maria is actually in the Cisco Kid's clothes riding away. Dunn receives this fake letter, believing it to be from Maria. When the Cisco Kid leaves her house, Dunn shoots Maria, believing her to be the Cisco Kid in disguise. Now farther away, the Cisco Kid laments that "[Maria's] flirting days are over, and she can finally settle down". He then makes his escape.

Cast
 Warner Baxter as the Cisco Kid
 Edmund Lowe as Sergeant Mickey Dunn
 Dorothy Burgess as Tonia Maria

Production 

Raoul Walsh was set to direct the film and star as the Cisco Kid, but had to abandon the project when a jackrabbit jumped through the windshield of a vehicle he was driving; the resulting wreck cost Walsh an eye. He never acted again, but continued his successful career as a film director.

Awards and nominations
At the 2nd Academy Awards, the film was nominated for five awards—Outstanding Picture; Best Director (Irving Cummings); Best Actor (Warner Baxter); Best Writing (Tom Barry)—tied for the most of the year with The Patriot; and Best Cinematography (Arthur Edeson). In a ceremony where no film won more than one award, only Warner Baxter's Best Actor nomination was successful.

Preservation
The Academy Film Archive preserved In Old Arizona in 2004.

Under the law, this movie will enter the public domain on January 1, 2024.

See also
 List of films with the most Oscars per ceremony

References

External links
 
 
 
 
 
 

1928 films
1928 Western (genre) films
Adaptations of works by O. Henry
American Western (genre) films
American black-and-white films
Cisco Kid
1920s English-language films
Films based on short fiction
Films directed by Irving Cummings
Films featuring a Best Actor Academy Award-winning performance
Films set in Arizona
Films shot in California
Films shot in Utah
Films shot in the Mojave Desert
Fox Film films
Transitional sound Western (genre) films
1920s American films